Leonardo 'Léo' Rodrigues (born 6 April 1991) is a Brazilian footballer who plays for Vila Nova as a right back.

Club career
Born in Caçador, Santa Catarina, Léo Rodrigues graduated with Figueirense's youth setup, making his senior debuts in 2011 in Campeonato Catarinense. In May 2011 he was loaned to Duque de Caxias, in Série B.

Léo Rodrigues made his professional debut on 28 May 2011, starting in a 1–2 home loss against Criciúma. He scored his first goal for Duque on 16 August, netting the first in a 2–1 home win against ASA.

Léo Rodrigues returned to Figueira in 2012, after suffering relegation with Duque de Caxias. He made his Série A debut on 8 August 2012, starting in a 0–2 home loss against Flamengo. He only appeared rarely with the side, again suffering another drop.

Léo Rodrigues was subsequently loaned to Boavista, Tombense (two spells), Fortaleza and Vila Nova. On 27 January 2015 he returned to Figueirense, being added to the main squad for the pre-season.

References

External links
Léo Rodrigues at playmakerstats.com (English version of ogol.com.br)

1991 births
Living people
Sportspeople from Santa Catarina (state)
Brazilian footballers
Association football defenders
Campeonato Brasileiro Série A players
Campeonato Brasileiro Série B players
Figueirense FC players
Duque de Caxias Futebol Clube players
Boavista Sport Club players
Tombense Futebol Clube players
Fortaleza Esporte Clube players
Vila Nova Futebol Clube players
Sampaio Corrêa Futebol Clube players
Macaé Esporte Futebol Clube players